Alicia Borrachero Bonilla (born 14 February 1968) is a Spanish actress. She became popular in Spain owing to her performance as Ana in television series Periodistas.

Biography 
Alicia Borrachero Bonilla was born on 14 February 1968 in Madrid, and studied at Colegio San Patricio. In 2003, she married actor Ben Temple, with whom she has had one child.

Theatre 
Don Quixote
Things I forgot to remember
La fabulosa historia de Diego Marín
Muerte en Granada
Sangre Ciega
The Killer Tongue
Tres palabras
Shooting Elizabeth

Filmography

References

External links
 

1968 births
Living people
Actresses from Madrid
Spanish film actresses
Spanish telenovela actresses
Spanish stage actresses
20th-century Spanish actresses
21st-century Spanish actresses